José Carlos Chaves Innecken (born 3 September 1958 in Atenas) is a retired Costa Rican football player who played for Alajuelense.

Club career
After spending a year at a high school in Ohio and some time in the youth teams of Saprissa, Chaves joined Alajuelense in 1980 and moved abroad to play for Inter Bratislava in the Czechoslovak First League during the 1990-91 and 1991-92 seasons. He returned to Costa Rica to win the 1992-93 league title with Herediano.

International career
He was one of the eldest members of the national team squad, that played in the 1990 FIFA World Cup held in Italy. Before the tournament, Chaves quit the national team since he was unhappy with coach Marvin Rodríguez, prompting de FA to replace Rodríguez by Bora Milutinovic who immediately recalled Chaves.

The left-sided defender or defensive midfielder played his final international game on 27 March 1994 against Norway.

Managerial career
After retiring as a player, Chaves became assistant coach at Alajuelense and then sporting director at Herediano. In 2012, he became a director at Alajuelense junior league team.

Personal life
Chaves is married to Lourdes González Rojas and they have three children.

References

External links

1958 births
Living people
People from Atenas (canton)
Association football midfielders
Costa Rican footballers
Costa Rica international footballers
1990 FIFA World Cup players
L.D. Alajuelense footballers
FK Inter Bratislava players
C.S. Herediano footballers
Liga FPD players
Czechoslovak First League players
Expatriate footballers in Czechoslovakia
Costa Rican expatriate footballers
Costa Rican expatriate sportspeople in Czechoslovakia